Disordered Minds (2003) is a crime novel by English writer Minette Walters.

Synopsis
In 1970 Harold Stamp, a intellectually disabled young man, was arrested for the murder of his grandmother - the only person who ever understood him - based on scant evidence and a retracted confession; three years later, having been found guilty by a jury, he kills himself in prison. However, Jonathan Hughes, an anthropologist specialising in social stereotypes, decides to re-examine the case and, in doing so, uncovers a plethora of dark secrets that could lead him into a confrontation with a psychotic killer.

External links 
More about Disordered Minds on Walters' website
Agent's dedicated page

2003 British novels
Novels by Minette Walters
Fiction set in 1970
Macmillan Publishers books